Four ships of the Royal Navy have borne the name HMS Tigress, after the female tiger:

  was a 12-gun  launched in 1797 and sold in 1802.
  was a 12-gun  launched in 1804 that the Danes captured in 1808.
  was a 12-gun gun-brig, previously the French ship Pierre Czar. She was captured in 1808, and was renamed HMS Algerine in 1814. She was sold in 1818.
  was an  launched in 1911. She was sold in 1921 and was broken up the following year.

See also
 
 

Royal Navy ship names